Van Howard Kelly (born March 18, 1946 in Charlotte, North Carolina) is a former Major League Baseball player. He played for the San Diego Padres of the National League. Kelly only played in the 1969 and 1970 baseball seasons. In 111 games over two years, Kelly had 66 hits in 298 at-bats. He also hit 4 home runs and had a .221 batting average. Kelly was also the manager of the 1975 Lethbridge Expos of the Pioneer Baseball League.

External links

1946 births
Living people
Major League Baseball third basemen
San Diego Padres players
Richmond Braves players
Baseball players from North Carolina